Kurt Langenbein (4 November 1910 – 22 October 1978) was a German international footballer.

References

1910 births
1978 deaths
Association football forwards
German footballers
Germany international footballers